Tears and Smiles is a 1917 American silent drama film directed by William Bertram and starring Marie Osborne, Philo McCullough and Marion Warner.

Cast
 Marie Osborne as Little Marie 
 Melvin Mayo as Marie's Father 
 Marion Warner as Marie's Mother 
 Philo McCullough as Mr. Greer 
 Katherine MacLaren as Mrs. Greer

References

Bibliography
 Robert B. Connelly. The Silents: Silent Feature Films, 1910-36, Volume 40, Issue 2. December Press, 1998.

External links
 

1917 films
1917 drama films
1910s English-language films
American silent feature films
Silent American drama films
American black-and-white films
Films directed by William Bertram
Pathé Exchange films
1910s American films